Kutrai is a village in Jagat block, Budaun district, Uttar Pradesh, India. Its village code is 128433. Budaun railway station is 11 KM away from the village. According to 2011 Census of India population of the village is 2,207, in which 1,210 are males and 997 are females.

References

Villages in Budaun district